Modulus is the diminutive from the Latin word modus meaning measure or manner. It, or its plural moduli, may refer to the following:

Physics, engineering and computing 
 Moduli (physics), scalar fields for which the potential energy function has continuous families of global minima
 The measurement of standard pitch in the teeth of a rotating gear
 Bulk modulus, a measure of compression resistance
 Elastic modulus, a measure of stiffness
Shear modulus, a measure of elastic stiffness
 Young's modulus, a specific elastic modulus
 Modulo operation (a % b, mod(a, b), etc.), in both math and programming languages; results in remainder of a division
 Casting modulus used in Chvorinov's rule.

Mathematics 
 Modulus (modular arithmetic), base of modular arithmetic
 Modulus, the absolute value of a real or complex number
 Moduli space, in mathematics a geometric space whose points represent algebro-geometric objects
 Conformal modulus, a measure of the size of a curve family
 Modulus of continuity, a function gauging the uniform continuity of a function
 Similarly, the modulus of a Dirichlet character
 Modulus (algebraic number theory), a formal product of places of a number field
 The modular function in the theory of Haar measure, often called simply the modulus

Other uses
 Modulus (gastropod) a genus of small sea snails
 Modulus Guitars, musical instrument manufacturer
 Modulus robot, a household robot

See also
 Module (disambiguation)
 Modulo (disambiguation)